The terms equal housing lender and equal opportunity lender are synonymous and refer to all banks insured by the Federal Deposit Insurance Corporation in the United States.  Such banks are prohibited from discriminating on the basis of race, color, religion, national origin, sex, handicap, or familial status.  They are required, in all advertisements of home loan related services, to explicitly use one of these two terms in describing themselves, or to use one of several approved logos.

This rule was introduced in the Fair Housing Amendments Act of 1988 which amended the Fair Housing Act of 1968.

References

Housing in the United States